Nault is a surname. Notable people with the surname include:

Bob Nault (born 1955), Canadian politician
Fernand Nault (1920–2006), Canadian dancer and choreographer
Joseph Daniel Nault (1888–1954), Canadian politician
Marie-Ève Nault (born 1982), Canadian soccer player